Anta Maqana (Quechua anta copper, maqana club, "copper club", Hispanicized spelling Antamajana) is a  mountain in the Huancavelica Region in Peru. It is located in the Huaytará Province, Pilpichaca District.

References 

Mountains of Peru
Mountains of Huancavelica Region